The Halle (Saale) tramway network is a network of tramways forming part of the public transport system in Halle (Saale), a city in the federal state of Saxony-Anhalt, Germany.

Network

(As of 20. July 2015)

Rolling stock

See also
List of town tramway systems in Germany
Trams in Germany

References

External links

 

Halle (Saale)
Transport in Halle (Saale)
Metre gauge railways in Germany
750 V DC railway electrification
Halle